Henrik Lannér (born 13 April 1968) is a Swedish equestrian. He competed in two events at the 1992 Summer Olympics.

References

External links
 

1968 births
Living people
Swedish male equestrians
Olympic equestrians of Sweden
Equestrians at the 1992 Summer Olympics
People from Borås
Sportspeople from Västra Götaland County